The Women's Windy City Open 2014 is the women's edition of the 2014 Windy City Open, which is a tournament of the WSA World Tour event International (Prize money : 50 000 $). The event took place at the University Club of Chicago in Chicago in the United States from 26 February to 3 March. Laura Massaro won her first Windy City Open trophy, beating Raneem El Weleily in the final.

Prize money and ranking points
For 2014, the prize purse was $50,000. The prize money and points breakdown is as follows:

Seeds

Draw and results

See also
WSA World Tour 2014
Men's Windy City Open 2014
Metro Squash Windy City Open

References

External links
WSA Windy City Open 2014 website
Windy City Open 2014 official website

Windy City Open
Windy City Open
Windy City Open
2014 in women's squash